Early Lake Erie was a prehistoric proglacial lake that existed at the end of the last ice age approximately 13,000 years ago. The early Erie fed waters to Glacial Lake Iroquois.

The ancient lake was similar in size to the current lake during glacial retreat, but for some period the eastern half of the lake was covered with ice.

Early-period Lake Erie was made up of smaller lakes (Lakes Warren, Wayne, Maumee and Lundy) with lower depths. Much of the ancient lake bed is now northern Ohio.

Early (low) Stage
12,000 years before present (YBP) the Laurentian ice sheet had melted to the east, creating an outlet for the Lake Erie basin at the Niagara Escarpment. Simultaneously, the ice sheet had opened a drainage between Lake Algonquin and Lake Ontario thorough the Kirkfield Outlet. This ended the outflow from Lake Algonquin into the Lake Erie Basin. Holocene history of Lake Erie began with a flood of water over the Niagara Escarpment. The flood created a channel in the moraines and bedrock lower water level in the Erie basin. The Niagara River Outlet, was over  lower than the present level of Lake Erie creating a non-glacial lake, called Early Lake Erie. The lake consisted of two lobes, one in the eastern basin and a smaller lake in the central basin.

Discharge from Lake Algonquin
About 10,400 YBP the ice sheet advanced southward, blocking the Kirkfield Outlet.  Once again, the Lake Erie basin received water from Lake Algonquin, through the Port Huron Outlet and the new St. Clair River-Lake St. Clair-Detroit River system. The additional water created a marshy swamp in the western basin, then it created a river system through the Pelee Passage. The shallow central basin overflowed the Norfolk Moraine creating the Pennsylvania Channel into the eastern basin. The deeper eastern basin overflowed Niagara Escarpment by the Niagara River for a brief time.  There is still a division of ideas about whether Early Lake Erie overflowed the Niagara River at this time or remained without an overflow.

Second low stage
By 10,300 YBP the North Bay Outlet opened between Lake Algonquin and the St. Lawrence River. The level of Lake Algonquin dropped, ending the outflow through the Port Huron outlet. For several thousand years Early Lake Erie did not receive water from the upper basins. This low water stage lasted for 5,000 years. The lake lost over 90 percent of its inflow, becoming stagnant. The lake became eutrophic, acerbated by lower precipitation and increased evaporation. A closed or endorheic lake basin was created Bathymetric data compiled by National Geographic Data Center in 1998 located a former shoreline submerged below Lake Erie.
The central basin was separate from the eastern basin, but with isostatic rebound in the eastern end, the water topped the Norfolk Moraine, creating one lake with a deep channel called the Pennsylvania Channel. An alternative may have been a significant inflow of water from the south shore tributaries, raising the water level, while deepening the Pennsylvania Channel, until a single lake was created.

Middle Stage
About 10,000 YBP the water levels began to level off. It continued to rise, by slowing for the next 2,000 years. This period has been called the "Middle Lake Erie". An alternative level at  has been proposed through radiocarbon dates.
It is believed that decreased precipitation and increased evaporation of set the changes created by the isostatic uplift.)  This Xerothermic or Hypsithermal Interval  existed for approximately 5,000 years (10,300 to 5,300 YBP). As the uplift continued, the North Bay Outlet rose, and the upper basin entered the stage of Lake Nipissing.  This was 5,400 YBP. Lake Erie remained isolated, but continued to rise. The Middle Stage ended around 5,300 YBP when drainage from Lake Nipissing was again diverted through the Port Huron outlet.  The increase in water, the growing humidity in the climate, and increased water levels created a large delta in western basin at the mouth of the ancestral Detroit River. The remaining depositional features in Lake Erie (i.e. the Buffalo Ridge, Norfolk Moraine, Conneaut Bank, and Presque Isle Bank) were flooded.  These underwater obstacles altered water circulation patterns, forming new surface features, including Long Point, Ontario, and Presque Isle, Pennsylvania.
The Lake St. Clair delta was formed during this time, (5,000-3,600 YBP).  The lacustrine clays under the delta have been radiocarbon dated at 7,300 YBP.  Thus the delta began during Lake Nipissing time

Highstand
The Niagara River Outlet eroded to its current level about 3,500 YBP.

Transition to modern Lake Erie
When Lake Erie reached its present level 3,500 YPB, the southern tributary river that had created incised channels through the lacustrine sediment and glacial till during the low-water stages was flooded.  This created the drowned estuarine river mouths common along the western shore. These drowned shores became the source of beach sand, forming the massive sand spits at Long Point and Presque Isle, and creating new spits at Point Pelee, Ontario, and Cedar Point, Ohio. At the same time barrier beaches were formed across the mouths of most of the estuarine tributaries.

See also
Great Black Swamp
Champlain Sea
 Lake Ojibway
Lake Algonquin 
 Lake Agassiz
 Lake Chicago
 Lake Maumee
Last glacial maximum
 Midcontinent Rift System
 Niagara Escarpment
Nipissing Great Lakes
List of prehistoric lakes

References

Brant RA, Herdendorf CE. 1972. Delineation of Great Lakes estuaries. Pages 710–718, in Proceedings 15the Conference on Great Lakes Research. International Association for Great Lakes Research.
Calkin PE, Feenstra BH. 1985. Evolution of the Erie-basin Great Lakes. Pages 149–170, in Karrow PF, Calkin PE, eds. Quaternary Evolution of the Great Lakes. St. John's (Newfoundland): Geological Association of Canada Special Paper 30.
Herdendorf CE. 1990b. Great Lakes estuaries. Estuaries 13:493-503.
Herdendorf CE, Braidech LL. 1972. Physical characteristics of the reef area of western Lake Erie. *Ohio Department of Natural Resources, Division of Geological Survey Report of Investigation 82. 90 *pp.
Herdendorf CE, Bailey ML. 1989. Evidence for an early delta of the Detroit River in western Lake Erie. Ohio Journal of Science 89:16-22.
Holcombe TL, Taylor LA, Reid DF, Warren JS, Vincent PA, Herdendorf CE. 2003. Revised Lake Erie postglacial lake level history based on new detailed bathymetry. Journal of Great Lakes Research *29:681-704.
Kaszycki CA. 1985. History of glacial Lake Algonquin in the Haliburton Region, South Central Ontario. Pages 109–123, in Karrow PF, Calkin PE, eds.Quaternary Evolution of the Great Lakes. St. John's (Newfoundland): Geological Association of Canada Special Paper 30.
Larsen CE. 1987. Geological history of glacial Lake Algonquin and the Upper Great Lakes. US Geological Survey Bulletin 1801. 36 pp.
Lewis CFM, Cameron GDM, Anderson TW, Heil CW Jr, Gareau PL. 2012. Lake levels in the Erie Basin of the Laurentian Great Lakes. Journal of Paleolimnology 47:493-511. 
Sears PB. 1942. Xerothermic theory. Botanical Review 8:708-736.

External sources
 Lake Erie Landscapes

Former lakes of North America
Geology of Indiana
Geology of Ohio
Geology of Michigan
Geology of New York (state)
Geology of Pennsylvania
Geological history of the Great Lakes
Proglacial lakes
Lake Erie
Glacial lakes of the United States
Glacial lakes of Canada
Glacial lakes of Ohio